In organic chemistry a diene (diolefin or alkadiene) is a covalent compound that contains two double bonds, usually among carbon atoms. They thus contain two alkene units, with the standard prefix di of systematic nomenclature.  As a subunit of more complex molecules, dienes occur in naturally occurring and synthetic chemicals and are used in organic synthesis.  Conjugated dienes are widely used as monomers in the polymer industry. Polyunsaturated fats are of interest to nutrition.

Classes
Dienes can be divided into three classes, depending on the relative location of the double bonds:
Cumulated dienes have the double bonds sharing a common atom. The result is more specifically called an allene.
Conjugated dienes have conjugated double bonds separated by one single bond. Conjugated dienes are more stable than other dienes because of resonance.
Unconjugated dienes have the double bonds separated by two or more single bonds. They are usually less stable than isomeric conjugated dienes. This can also be known as an isolated diene.

According to the Gold Book definition, a "diene" could include one or more heteroatoms which replace unsaturated carbon atoms, giving structures that could more specifically be called heterodienes.

Compounds that contain more than two double bonds are called polyenes. Polyenes and dienes share many properties.

Synthesis of dienes

On an industrial scale, butadiene is prepared by thermal cracking of butanes. In a similarly non-selective process, dicyclopentadiene is obtained from coal tars.

In the laboratory, more directed and more delicate processes are employed such as dehydrohalogenations and condensations.  Myriad methods have been developed, such as the Whiting reaction.  Families of nonconjugated dienes are derived from the oligomerization and dimerization of conjugated dienes.  For example, 1,5-cyclooctadiene and vinylcyclohexene are produced by dimerization of 1,3-butadiene.

Diene-containing fatty acids are biosynthesized from acetyl CoA.

α,ω-Dienes have the formula (CH2)n(CH=CH2)2.  They are prepared industrially by ethenolysis of cyclic dienes.  For example, 1,5-hexadiene and 1,9-decadiene, useful crosslinking agents and synthetic intermediates, are produced from 1,5-cyclooctadiene and cyclooctene, respectively.  The catalyst is derived from Re2O7 on alumina.

Reactivity and uses

Polymerization
The most heavily practiced reaction of alkenes, dienes included, is polymerization.  1,3-Butadiene is a precursor to rubber used in tires, and isoprene is the precursor to natural rubber.  Chloroprene is related but it is a synthetic monomer.

Cycloadditions
An important reaction for conjugated dienes is the Diels–Alder reaction.  Many specialized dienes have been developed to exploit this reactivity for the synthesis of natural products (e.g., Danishefsky's diene).

Other addition reactions
Conjugated dienes add reagents such as bromine and hydrogen by both 1,2-addition and 1,4-addition pathways.  Addition of polar reagents can generate complex architectures:

Metathesis reactions
Nonconjugated dienes are substrates for ring-closing metathesis reactions.  These reactions require a metal catalyst:

Acidity
The position adjacent to a double bond is acidic because the resulting allyl anion is stabilized by resonance. This effect becomes more pronounced as more alkenes are involved to create greater stability. For example, deprotonation at position 3 of a 1,4-diene or position 5 of a 1,3-diene give a pentadienyl anion. An even greater effect is seen if the anion is aromatic, for example, deprotonation of cyclopentadiene to give the cyclopentadienyl anion.

As ligands
Dienes are widely used chelating ligands in organometallic chemistry.  In some cases they serve as placeholder ligands, being removed during a catalytic cycle.  For example, the cyclooctadiene ("cod") ligands in bis(cyclooctadiene)nickel(0) are labile.  In some cases, dienes are spectator ligands, remaining coordinated throughout a catalytic cycle and influencing the product distributions.  Chiral dienes have also been described.  Other diene complexes include (butadiene)iron tricarbonyl, cyclobutadieneiron tricarbonyl, and cyclooctadiene rhodium chloride dimer.

References

 Diene